Danny Pearson (January 6, 1953 – August 17, 2018) was an American composer and singer-songwriter. His sole release was the 1978 album Barry White Presents Mr. Danny Pearson, which was produced by Barry White. The lead single from the album, "What's Your Sign Girl?", peaked at #16 on the U.S. R&B charts and at #106 on the Billboard Bubbling Under Hits. At the time of his death, he was in the process of recording a new album.

Pearson was born in Stonewall, Mississippi, and in 1955 his family moved to Racine, Wisconsin where he spent his childhood. He died in 2018 in Stonewall after a three-year battle with liver cancer, at the age of 65.

Discography

Albums

Singles

References

External links
 
 Official Facebook page
 His last interview

1953 births
2018 deaths
Musicians from Mississippi
People from Clarke County, Mississippi